Boris Vladimirov Velchev (born 26 April 1962) is a Bulgarian jurist who served as the chief prosecutor of Bulgaria between 2006 and 2012, being the youngest person to hold the position.

Biography 

In 1981, Velchev graduated from the English language high school in Sofia. He was subsequently enrolled as a student at the juridical faculty of Sofia University, earning the right to practice law in 1990.

Since 1 November 2012, Velchev has been a judge at the Constitutional Court of Bulgaria.

In addition to his native Bulgarian, Velchev also speaks English and Russian. His hobbies include the study of history and numismatics.

References 

1962 births
Living people
People from Sofia
General Prosecutors of Bulgaria